Irina Kemmsies (born 14 May 1996) is a German volleyball player.

She played for the German National Team in the 2017 Women's European Volleyball Championship.

Career 
Irina Kemmsies played volleyball in her home away from home at SC Grün-Weiß Paderborn. In 2011, she came to USC Münster, where she first played in the youth team in the Second Bundesliga. From 2013 to 2016, she played in the USC's Bundesliga squad. After that she changed to the Ligakonkurrenten 1. VC Wiesbaden.

In 2013, Irina Kemmsies won the seventh place in the U18 European Championships with the German Youth Team and with the Junior Women's Team eighth in the U23 World Championships.

Kemmsies graduated from the Pascal-Gymnasium in Münster.

References

External links 
 Profile at VC Wiesbaden
 Profile at World of Volley

1996 births
Living people
German women's volleyball players